Brian Rolando Blasi (born 8 February 1996) is an Argentine professional footballer who plays as a right-back or centre-back for Argentine Primera División side Barracas Central.

Career
Unión Santa Fe signed Blasi in 2007. His senior career began with them in 2015, first appearing in the squad in November when he was an unused substitute versus Estudiantes. His debut arrived on 20 May 2017, he played the full duration of a home defeat to Arsenal de Sarandí in the Argentine Primera División. He made five appearances during 2016–17, the last arriving on 25 June against Boca Juniors; he scored his first senior goal in the process.

In June 2022, Blasi joined Barracas Central.

Career statistics
.

References

External links

1996 births
Living people
Sportspeople from Santa Fe Province
Argentine footballers
Association football defenders
Argentine Primera División players
Unión de Santa Fe footballers
Barracas Central players
Argentine people of Italian descent